First Baptist Church of Interlaken is a historic Baptist church located at Interlaken in Seneca County, New York.  It was constructed in 1861 and is a brick and stone church with a vernacular Romanesque Revival style and decorative features.  It features two irregular corner towers that convey an overall asymmetry to the edifice.

It was listed on the National Register of Historic Places in 2002.

References

External links
First Baptist Church of Interlaken website

Churches on the National Register of Historic Places in New York (state)
Baptist churches in New York (state)
Churches completed in 1861
19th-century Baptist churches in the United States
Churches in Seneca County, New York
1861 establishments in New York (state)
National Register of Historic Places in Seneca County, New York